WWF Attitude is a professional wrestling video game based on the World Wrestling Federation (WWF, now WWE) released by Acclaim Entertainment in 1999 for the PlayStation and Nintendo 64. A slightly enhanced port of the game was later released for the Dreamcast, as well as a handheld version for the Game Boy Color. The game is named after the WWF's then-current "Attitude" marketing campaign, with the tagline "Get it" also being used on company programming during that period.

The game is the sequel to WWF War Zone and is the last WWF game to be published by Acclaim. The WWF signed a deal with THQ later in 1999, ending a ten-year relationship with Acclaim that began with WWF WrestleMania. Acclaim then signed a deal with Extreme Championship Wrestling, producing two games using the same game engine, ECW Hardcore Revolution and ECW Anarchy Rulz.

The PlayStation version had been originally scheduled to be released on June 3, 1999, but the release date was pushed back to August 5 due the death of Owen Hart to whom the game is dedicated.

Gameplay 

Gameplay from WWF War Zone was for the most part retained. Players execute wrestling maneuvers by grappling with an opponent then entering a sequence of motions and buttons presses. On-screen life meters indicate how close a wrestler is to defeat, with the meter turning red when a small amount of health is left. The previous edition's "Challenge Mode" was replaced by a Career Mode which allowed a player to wrestle as a WWF superstar. The player first starts wrestling on house shows winning matches to work their way up to RAW, then Pay-Per-View events and eventually getting opportunities to challenge for the European, Intercontinental and WWF championship titles. New match types were also added, including the First Blood and the I Quit Match.

Features added since WWF War Zone include a Create-A-Stable mode and a Pay-Per-View mode, which allows players to set up their own wrestling event - a series of matches, the name of the event, and an arena. The game includes a customizable arena option, including the ability to edit the color of lights, ring ropes, turnbuckles, and logo on the side of the ring. WWF Attitude also features the audio commentary, provided by Shane McMahon and Jerry Lawler.

Create-A-Wrestler mode was expanded with original entrance music, as well as superstar nicknames with unique commentary and crowd chants for each name.  Vocals for the original entrance themes were provided by Road Dogg of The New Age Outlaws, a popular wrestler at the time of the game's release who would frequently show off his mic skills during events.

The Game Boy Color version of the game is slightly different from its home console counterparts, using passwords as a way to save a player's progress.

Development 
Acclaim added full superstar entrances to the game, improving over the short entrances from War Zone. Match commentary was recorded by Jerry "The King" Lawler and Shane McMahon. Instead of the commentators talking about each of the wrestlers before the match like on War Zone, each wrestler now has a set of pre-match taunts.

Originally, the game was to include fictional jobbers that players would face early on in the Career Mode. For unknown reasons, the fictional jobbers were removed from the game; however, their voices, ring attires, and entrance theme songs remain accessible in the Create-A-Wrestler mode.

In addition, the game's original release date was meant to be March 1999 before getting delayed until June, and then again until its ultimate release in August. Its first planned release date was the time on WWF television when "Dr. Death" Steve Williams was getting a midcard push, where he was managed by a heel Jim Ross. The official strategy guide of WWF Attitude makes mention of this, and "JR's boy" is a chant in the game, referencing the midcard storyline. For many years, players were confused by his inclusion in the game.

Though not playable in the game, The Hardy Boyz provided motion capture for the game.

The intro to the PlayStation and Nintendo 64 versions included a dedication to Owen Hart, who died shortly before the game's release and was featured in the game as a playable character. Although Owen was a "heel" prior to his death, his playable character is a "face", which meant that the crowd would cheer for him instead of booing. His death delayed the PlayStation and Nintendo 64 versions from its initial release of June 1999, likely to remove his Blue Blazer alternative costume as seen in early screenshots from an April 1999 prototype version of the game.

The dedication to Owen was removed from the Dreamcast version due to a wrongful death lawsuit being filed against the WWF by the Hart family. Owen is still however a playable character in this version.

The Dreamcast version was released several months after the PlayStation and Nintendo 64 games, around the same time as THQ's first WWF game WWF WrestleMania 2000 and features improved graphics compared to its PlayStation and Nintendo 64 counterparts, with higher-resolution texture maps and a better animated, less pixelated crowd.

Reception

The PlayStation version received favorable reviews, while the rest of the console versions received mixed or average reviews according to review aggregator GameRankings. Daniel Erickson of NextGen gave the Dreamcast and Nintendo 64 versions negative reviews in two separate issues, saying that the latter was "worth a rental for WWF fans, but everyone else should just wait for THQ and EA to take their shots" (#59, November 1999); and later calling the former "a pathetic port – the only reason this game gets one star is that the jewel case was reusable" (#62, February 2000).

The Rookie of GamePro said of the Nintendo 64 version in one review, "If you loved War Zone, you're going to want to grab WWF Attitude. The combination of the huge lineup of wrestlers and excellent gameplay features like the Career mode and create-your-own-pay-per-view event will satisfy any wrestling fan's hunger for topnotch top-rope action." He also said of the PlayStation version, "If you're a WWF fan, you'll want this game. Its expanded roster of features and wealth of kick-ass wretling superstars will have you slobber-knockin' and trash-talkin' with your buddies all night long. You smell what The Rock is cookin'?" The Freshman, however, said in another review that the N64 version's "massive array of options and its long roster of superstars will keep wrestling fans busy for a long time, but its bland graphics and sounds may turn off everyone else. Attitude adds features over War Zone, but it doesn't really make that many improvements. Attitudes got the moves, but it needs to put on more of a show if it's going to go for the title." In another review of the PlayStation version, The D-Pad Destroyer called it "a decent game with an incredible array of options but with a sore lack of any real personality. Attitude has a great Create-A-Wrestler mode, but eventually you will want to bring your creation into the ring. When it comes to that, WWF fans will have a great time, but the rest will quickly become frustrated. This sequel to War Zone just doesn't have enough attitude." The Enforcer later said of the Dreamcast version in one review, "If you own only a Dreamcast and are a diehard wrestling fan, you're gonna want WWF Attitude. If you have either the PlayStation or N64 version, however, you'll be satisfied with a rental." Scary Larry, however, said of the same console version in another review, "The ultimate wrestling game, one that takes the experience and immerses you totally inside of it, may still be a ways off. But Dreamcast fans will feel cheated out of a winner by this fake looking remake. Hope for Smackdown on the Dreamcast - Attitude goes flat on you." (The Dreamcast version of WWF SmackDown!, however, was later cancelled.)

The PlayStation version was also a bestseller in the UK.

See also
List of licensed wrestling video games
List of fighting games
WWE '13 – a later Attitude Era-themed game

Notes

References

External links

1999 video games
Acclaim Entertainment games
Dreamcast games
Game Boy Color games
Multiplayer and single-player video games
Nintendo 64 games
PlayStation (console) games
Sports video games with career mode
Video game sequels
WWE video games
Professional wrestling games
Video games developed in the United States